Nick Marable (born May 7, 1987) of Collierville, Tennessee, is an American wrestler for Sunkist Kids Wrestling Club who represented the United States at the 2014 World Wrestling Championships. He later served as the assistant wrestling coach for West Virginia University.

High school
Marable attended Christian Brothers High School in Memphis, Tennessee from 2001 to 2005. Marable was a three time placewinner in the Tennessee state tournament, winning state titles in 2004 and 2005, and finishing runner up in 2003. Marable won the 2003 U.S. Freestyle Cadet National Championship at 145 pounds.

College
At the University of Missouri in Columbia, Missouri, Marable was a three-time NCAA qualifier and two-time NCAA All-American, finishing third in 2008 and seventh in 2009. Marable finished his college career with 116 wins, which was the eighth-most in Missouri history at the time of his graduation.

International
Marable would have continued wrestling success at the international level upon graduating college in 2010. His notable tournament wins include the 2011 Pan American Championships, 2013 NYAC International,  2014 Yasar Dogu, 2014 Grand Prix of Paris, and the 2015 Dave Schultz Memorial.

At the 2014 Yashar Dogu Grand Prix, in the quarter finals, Marable beat Jordan Burroughs 4–4 on criteria. This marked the first loss of Jordan Burroughs career at the international level and broke Burroughs win streak spanning since 2011.

Marable would represent the United States at the 2014 World Wrestling Championships, finishing 2-1 and in 8th place in the 70 kg weight class after losing to two-time bronze medalist Ali Shabanau.

References

American wrestlers
Living people
University of Missouri alumni
1987 births
People from Collierville, Tennessee